Gillooly may refer to:

Gillooly, West Virginia, an unincorporated community in Lewis County
Laurence Gillooly, an Irish Roman Catholic clergyman who served as the Bishop of Elphin